Lamine Sarr (born 6 July 2001) is a footballer who plays as a goalkeeper.

Career statistics

References

External links
 

2001 births
Living people
Italian footballers
Association football goalkeepers
A.S. Pro Piacenza 1919 players
Serie C players